The Circe effect is a phenomenon proposed by William Jencks seen in chemistry and biochemistry where in order to speed up a reaction, the ground state of the substrate is destabilized by an enzyme.

Mechanism
Highly favourable binding of a substrate at a non-reactive site will force the reactive site of the substrate to be more reactive by putting it in a very unfavourable position. This effect was observed in orotidine 5'-phosphate decarboxylase. This can occur by positioning a charged amino acid group next to the charged substrate thus destabilizing it, thus making the reaction occur faster. Furthermore, the substrate is put into an optimal position by the enzyme for the reaction to occur, thus decreasing the entropy greatly.

Etymology
This process was named after Circe in Homer's Odyssey, who lured men and turned them into pigs.

References

Biomolecules
Catalysis
Metabolism
Process chemicals
Circe